Corey Jermaine Chamblin (born May 29, 1977) is an American football coach who is the defensive backs coach for the San Antonio Brahmas of the XFL and was previously the defensive backs coach for the Birmingham Stallions of the United States Football League (USFL). He is a former professional gridiron football defensive back and was signed by the Baltimore Ravens of the National Football League (NFL) as an undrafted free agent in 1999. He played college football at Tennessee Tech. As a player, Chamblin has also been a member of the Jacksonville Jaguars, Green Bay Packers, Tampa Bay Buccaneers, Denver Broncos, Rhein Fire and Indianapolis Colts.

He was head coach of the Saskatchewan Roughriders of the CFL from 2012 to part-way through 2015. He won the 101st Grey Cup and was awarded the Annis Stukus Trophy, given to the CFL's Coach of the Year, in 2013.

College career
Chamblin was a preseason All-Ohio Valley Conference selection his senior year at Tennessee
Tech. He played in 43 games with 35 starts, totaling 161 tackles, three interceptions, eight passes
defensed and two blocked punts.

Professional career

Baltimore Ravens
Chamblin signed with the Baltimore Ravens as an undrafted free agent, but was waived on September 5.

Jacksonville Jaguars
Chamblin signed with the Jacksonville Jaguars' practice squad on September 7, before being released on September 21 and signed to the active roster. He appeared in eleven regular season games for the Jaguars, all on special teams, where he notched three special teams tackles and blocked a punt in a divisional playoff game against the Miami Dolphins.

Green Bay Packers
On August 3, 2001, the Green Bay Packers signed Chamblin.

Tampa Bay Buccaneers
On January 28, 2002, Chamblin signed with the Tampa Bay Buccaneers.

Denver Broncos
On January 6, 2003 the Denver Broncos signed Chamblin to a future contract. On August 22, 2003, he was waived by the Broncos.

Rhein Fire
In 2004, Chamblin signed with the Rhein Fire of NFL Europa.

Indianapolis Colts
On August 10, 2004, Chamblin signed with the Indianapolis Colts. On September 5, 2004, he was cut by the Colts.

Coaching career

Early years
Chamblin began his coaching career with the Frankfurt Galaxy of NFL Europe in 2006 before joining the Winnipeg Blue Bombers of the Canadian Football League in 2007 as the defensive backs coach. He then spent three seasons with the Calgary Stampeders in the same capacity while winning his first Grey Cup championship in 2008. He was then hired as the defensive coordinator of the Hamilton Tiger-Cats for the 2011 CFL season.

Saskatchewan Roughriders
On December 15, 2011, Chamblin was hired as the head coach of the Saskatchewan Roughriders. On November 10, 2013, Chamblin won his first CFL head coaching career playoff game, a 29–25 win over the BC Lions. On November 17, 2013, Chamblin won the West Final over the Calgary Stampeders, taking the Roughriders to the Grey Cup, which they won on November 25, the first time in his head coaching career.

In January 2014, Chamblin, along with Hamilton Tiger Cats head coach Kent Austin and Calgary Stampeders head coach John Hufnagel, was nominated for 2013 Coach of The Year. On February 5, 2014, it was announced Chamblin won the award.

On August 31, 2015, after leading the Roughriders to an 0–9 start, Chamblin was fired and relieved of his head coaching duties along with general manager Brendan Taman.

Toronto Argonauts
On March 7, 2017, Chamblin was named defensive coordinator, defensive backs coach, and assistant head coach for the Toronto Argonauts. The Argonauts won the Grey Cup for that 2017 season, Chamblin's third Grey Cup win as a coach.

Arkansas
In June 2018, Chamblin was hired as a defensive backs quality control coach at the University of Arkansas.

Toronto Argonauts (second stint)
Following the firing of Marc Trestman after the 2018 season, Chamblin was named head coach of the Argonauts on December 10, 2018. After a 4–14 season in 2019, Chamblin was fired.

San Antonio Brahmas
Chamblin was officially hired by the San Antonio Brahmas on September 13, 2022

CFL coaching record

References

External links
 Saskatchewan Roughriders bio

1977 births
Living people
Players of American football from Birmingham, Alabama
American football cornerbacks
African-American players of American football
African-American coaches of American football
African-American coaches of Canadian football
Tennessee Tech Golden Eagles football players
Jacksonville Jaguars players
Rhein Fire players
Frankfurt Galaxy coaches
Winnipeg Blue Bombers coaches
Calgary Stampeders coaches
Hamilton Tiger-Cats coaches
Saskatchewan Roughriders coaches
Toronto Argonauts coaches
21st-century African-American sportspeople
20th-century African-American sportspeople
Birmingham Stallions (2022) coaches